Collita coreana is a moth of the  family Erebidae. It is found in Korea. Records for the Russian Far East and Japan are probably based on misidentifications of Manulea ussurica.

The wingspan is 25–27 mm. The forewings are yellowish grey with a smooth yellow costal streak. The hindwings are the same colour, but slightly paler.

References

Moths described in 1888
Lithosiina
Moths of Japan